Claife is a civil parish in the South Lakeland District of Cumbria, England.  It contains 45 listed buildings that are recorded in the National Heritage List for England.  Of these, four are listed at Grade II*, the middle of the three grades, and the others are at Grade II, the lowest grade.  The parish is in the Lake District National Park to the west of Windermere.  It contains the villages and settlements of Far Sawrey, Near Sawrey, Colthouse, Loanthwaite, High Wray and Low Wray, and the surrounding countryside.  Most of the listed buildings are farmhouses, farm buildings, and houses with associated structures.  The other listed buildings include churches, a public house, and a bridge.


Key

Buildings

References

Citations

Sources

Lists of listed buildings in Cumbria